Avraham Zvi Yehuda Meshi Zahav (19 July 1959 - 29 June 2022) was an Israeli social activist, a member of the Haredi Jewish community, and founder and chairman of ZAKA.

In March 2021, following sexual misconduct allegations made against him for abusing men, women, and children, Meshi Zahav attempted to take his own life. He remained in a coma for over a year until he died on 29 June 2022.

Biography
Avraham Zvi Meshi Zahav was born to writer Menachem Saamson Mendel and Sara Zissel, daughter of Rabbi , the secretary of the Edah HaChareidis rabbinical court. He grew up in the Mea Shearim neighbourhood in Jerusalem, an 11th generation family living in Jerusalem. He studied in the Talmud Torah "Etz Chaim", and in the yeshivas "Tiferet Yisrael", "Ohel Yaakov" and "Torah Ore".  Meshi Zahav resided in Givat Ze'ev and was married to Batsheva, with whom he had seven children. Between late 2020 and early 2021, Meshi Zahav lost his brother, who died of a serious illness, his father, and his mother, who died of covid. Following allegations of sexual abuse, and the initiation of a police investigation in March 2021, Meshi-Zahav attempted suicide in April 2021 and remained in a coma until he died on 29 June 2022.

Public activism
As a young man, he was one of the leaders of the Haredi community's protests against the State of Israel and its institutions. As a result, he said, he was detained by the police dozens of times. During this period, Meshi-Zahav was named "Kambatz (Operations Officer) of the Ultra-Orthodox Community". His nickname on the police radio network (which he used to listen to) was "13 Black".

Meshi-Zahav was the editor of the Haredi communities newspaper Ha’eda. With his brother Zvi, he published seven books on the struggles of the Haredi community in Israel.

During the attack on bus line 405 in 1990, Meshi Zahav arrived with other yeshiva boys to provide first aid to the victims. On his way home, he concluded that if in the enemy's view everyone is equal, so too for him. In the 1990s, he arrived at the scenes of suicide bombing attacks in Israel, among other things, and treated the bodies of those killed. As a result, ZAKA (Disaster Victim Identification) was founded. In his capacity as Chairman of ZAKA, he worked for inter-religious and secular reconciliation.

In 2003, he lit, as one of the founders of ZAKA, a beacon at the torch lighting ceremony on Mount Herzl. He was criticized by people in the Haredi community for this, in particular for declaring the ceremony "the glory of the State of Israel." 

Three of his sons enlisted in the IDF, two of them for combat service, in Golani and in the paratroopers. During the Second Lebanon War, he founded the "Israel Together" movement, which employed volunteers who assisted residents in northern communities. During Operation Protective Edge he criticised the Haredi leadership for not attending the funerals of IDF soldiers and not comforting the bereaved families.

In 2018, he founded with Carmit Naimi and another "Eshet Lapidot" organization, which is a women's organization in several countries around the world that deals with community assistance. The organisation organizes resuscitation courses for women, works to care for neighbors in need, supports Haredi soldiers who are unable to return home, and more.

Meshi-Zahav was a member of committees to promote the recruitment of Haredi Jews to the IDF and their integration into the labor market. He also participated in the public committee established by Chief of Staff Aviv Kochavi in December 2019 to examine the forgery of the number of Haredim who have enlisted in the IDF in recent years.

Sexual assault allegations
In the early 2010s an allegation of male child sexual abuse by Yehuda Meshi Zahav was made to the police,who soon closed their investigation; everywhere his name was mentioned "the door was shut". But after it was reported that Zahav had won the Israel Prize in 2021, a newspaper published accusations that he had been using his status and power to assault women and children since the 1980s. After a new police investigation was started he tried to kill himself, ending up in a coma, and dying a year later.

Awards and recognition 

 2001 – Ministry of Labor and Social Affairs Award
 2001 – Outstanding United Nations Volunteer (UNV)
 2003 – President's Gift to a Volunteer
 2003 – Lights a beacon on Independence Day
 2004 – Minister of Health Award
 2010 – Citizen's End of Year Promotes Road Safety
 2014 – The masterpiece of the Lyons International Organization
 2017 – Receiving the Paul Harris O'Shea Of Rotary International Organization
 2018 – Rotary Shield for International Rotary Ethics.
2018 – elected one of the 100 most positively influential people of the Jewish nation by the Jewish newspaper Algemeiner Journal.
 2021 – Winner of the Israel Prize for special contribution to society and the state, but gave up the prize in light of the publication of the sexual allegations against him.

References

1959 births
2022 deaths
People from Jerusalem
Child sexual abuse scandals in Judaism
Israeli activists
Israeli Orthodox Jews